Thomas Preson "Tommy" Phillips (born October 7, 1980), who goes by the stage name Preson Phillips, is an American Christian musician and pastor of Seminole Heights' Watermark Church, who primarily plays a folk rock, roots rock, and Southern rock style of worship music. He has released four studio albums, The Observant & the Anawim in 2008, Weep...He Loves The Mourner's Tears in 2010, Wrath in 2011, and In Our Winters in 2014.

Early and personal life
Preson Phillips was born on October 7, 1980 in Orange, California, as Thomas Preson Phillips, who grew up to pastor Seminole Heights’ Watermark Church, located in Tampa, Florida, where he resides with his wife and children.

Music career
His music recording career began in 2008, with the studio album, The Observant & the Anawim, that was released on June 28, 2008, from Come&Live! Records. The second studio album, Weep...He Loves The Mourner's Tears, was released on March 16, 2010, by Come&Live! Records. Their subsequent release, Wrath, was released on November 1, 2011, with Come&Live! Records. He released, In Our Winters, on June 3, 2014, independently.

Band members
Current members
 Thomas Preson "Tommy" Phillips
 Rachel Collins
 Nate Murray
 Mickey Holm

Discography
Studio albums
 The Observant & the Anawim (June 28, 2008, Come&Live!)
 Weep...He Loves The Mourner's Tears (March 16, 2010, Come&Live!)
 Wrath (November 1, 2011, Come&Live!)
 In Our Winters (June 3, 2014, Independent)
 Tempters (June 5th, 2019, Independent)

References

External links
 Official website

1980 births
Living people
American performers of Christian music
Musicians from Orange County, California
Musicians from Tampa, Florida
Songwriters from California
Songwriters from Florida